Santa Maria Maggiore (Ossolano: Santa Marìa) is a comune (municipality) in the Province of Verbano-Cusio-Ossola in the Italian region Piedmont, in  Valle Vigezzo, located about  northeast of Turin and about  north of Verbania, on the border with Switzerland.

Santa Maria Maggiore borders the following municipalities: Campo (Vallemaggia) (Switzerland), Craveggia, Druogno, Malesco, Masera, Montecrestese, Toceno, Trontano, Vergeletto (Switzerland).

Santa Maria Maggiore is located on the narrow gauge Domodossola–Locarno railway, also known as the Vigezzo railway (Italian: Vigezzina) which negotiates the rugged Italian Alps terrain between Domodossola, Italy, on the east and Locarno, Switzerland, on the west. It also passes through the villages of Intragna, and Malesco.

References

External links

 comune.santamariamaggiore.vb.it/
http://english.santamariamaggiore.info/